Edward Clifford (1844 in Bristol – 1907) was an English artist and author.

Clifford was the younger brother of Mary, who later became a pioneering Poor Law Guardian, and the other brother of Alfred, who later served as Bishop of Lucknow.

Work
Clifford is best known for his portraits in watercolor, and was associated with the Aesthetic Movement in late 19th-century England.  He was also honorary Secretary of the Church Army, which evangelized for the Church of England.  Clifford visited India and Kashmir to learn about methods of controlling leprosy.  He returned to England and then traveled to Honolulu and visited the leper colony in Kalaupapa, Hawaii in 1888, where he met Father Damien.  During this time, there was a widespread fear that leprosy might reach Great Britain, and Damien’s name had become synonymous with the fight against it.  After returning to England, Clifford made watercolor paintings from portrait sketches made in Hawaii and eventually, in 1889, published an account of the journey.

The Bishop Museum (Honolulu), the Harvard University Portrait Collection, the Honolulu Museum of Art, the National Portrait Gallery (London), and the National Portrait Gallery (United States) are among the public collections holding work by Edward Clifford.

Footnotes

References
 Bénézit Dictionary of Artists, English edition, Paris: Gründ, 2006.
 Clifford, Edward, Father Damien; A Journey from Cashmere to his Home in Hawaii, London: Macmillan, 1889.
 Rooks, Michael, "Portrait of Joseph Damien de Veuster (Father Damien), ca. 1889, By Edward Clifford", Calendar News (Honolulu Academy of Arts), Vol. 80, No. 1, January–February 2008, pp. 10–11.
 Severson, Don R. Finding Paradise: Island Art in Private Collections, University of Hawaii Press, 2002, pp. 83–4.

External links

 Edward Clifford in AskArt.com
 Smithsonian American Art Museum, Art Inventories Catalog

19th-century English painters
English male painters
20th-century English painters
English portrait painters
English non-fiction writers
Artists from Hawaii
English watercolourists
1844 births
1907 deaths
Artists from Bristol
English male non-fiction writers
Church Army people
19th-century English male artists
20th-century English male artists